Tyketto is an American hard rock band, based out of New York City, New York, United States. The group was put together in 1987 by the former Waysted vocalist Danny Vaughn, with Brooke St. James (guitar), Jimi Kennedy (bass), and Michael Clayton (drums).

History
The band saw their name painted on a wall in Brooklyn and thought it sounded cool. By 1989, the band had signed to Geffen Records and released their debut album Don't Come Easy, which included the successful single "Forever Young." Musically, the album was somewhere between Whitesnake and Bon Jovi, and Tyketto opened for the former on many bills. However, the rise of the grunge sound in 1991 saw Tyketto's hopes of a big breakthrough begin to recede. Kennedy left the band and was replaced by Jaimie Scott. Their second album was rejected by Geffen and finally emerged in 1994 under the title Strength in Numbers on CMC International in the U.S. and Music for Nations elsewhere in the world.

The following year, Vaughn left the band to look after his wife, who had developed cancer, and was replaced by former Tall Stories vocalist Steve Augeri. (Augeri later became lead vocalist for Journey.) This line-up released Shine (which was a departure from their classic sound) in 1995, again on CMC / Music for Nations. However, dwindling audiences and the changing landscape of the rock industry saw the band split up in 1996, releasing the live album Take Out & Served Up Live as a swan song, having never really broken through. The various band members went on to other projects: most notably Vaughn, Clayton, and Scott who reunited in Vaughn. Vaughn would eventually start releasing material under his own name in 2007.

In 2004, Tyketto reformed for a reunion tour with the full original lineup. They played a second set of reunion dates in 2007 and stated at the time that this was the last time the original four members, or any other line up, would ever perform under the Tyketto name. To coincide with the dates the band released an The Last Sunset - Farewell 2007 consisting of alternative versions of previously released songs and unreleased songs unearthed from long forgotten demo tapes. Despite this announcement, in 2008 Tyketto reformed again for more dates. In April, they played the "Hard In Rio 2" festival in Brazil, and also played four European dates in October 2008 including Firefest. However, due to scheduling conflicts, Brooke St. James was unable to join the band for these dates and was replaced by P.J. Zitarosa, a former member of Vaughn and Vaughn's solo career backing band.

Tyketto toured Europe in January 2009 and played at the Download Festival in the UK in June 2010. They also played a U.S. show and a worldwide webcast in November 2011. The live worldwide webcast was a fan interactive concert and featured the original line up of Danny Vaughn, Brooke St. James, Michael Clayton, and Jimi Kennedy onstage together for the first time in years, along with their newest member Bobby Lynch on keyboards. The band released Dig in Deep in April 2012. The European tour that followed the release of Dig in Deep was the swansong for their original guitarist Brooke St James, as touring life no longer appealed.  The search for a replacement found Chris Green.  Green joined now permanent keyboard player Ged Rylands to round out Tyketto heading into 2014.

2014 brought with it the 25th anniversary of the band forming and major touring plans and bookings followed, along with the release of the band's first DVD entitled Documentally Yours. The first half of the year saw a UK tour, built around the Hard Rock Hell AOR Festival; all of which were used as live prep for the booking on the Monsters of Rock Cruise which sailed from Miami in late March.  The two shows on the cruise would serve as a springboard for several other high-profile bookings.  The latter half of 2014 saw a twelve date, five country tour around Europe.

The band released their new album, Reach, on 14 October 2016. The album features bassist Chris Childs in place of Kennedy and received excellent reviews.

In 2016 they had a third call back to The Monsters Of Rock Cruise (with Justin James standing in for Jim Kennedy on bass), Hard Rock Hell AOR 2016 and 2 shows as a double bill with the Dan Reed Network. A 2016 Don’t Come Easy Tour took place in November. In July they played Rockfest Barcelona along with bands such as Iron Maiden and Twisted Sister.
2016 saw a Rock Candy re-release of Don’t Come Easy with new sleeve details and photographs to commemorate the 25th anniversary of their debut album. In March the band's current line up, including Childs on bass, recorded a new Tyketto album at Rockfield Studios in Wales and was released on 15 October 2016.
Live In Milan the bands first live CD/DVD combo was released in late 2017 and Greg Smith joined them on bass for the fall Reach tour dates. In 2018 Tyketto played the Monsters Of Rock Cruise, M3 in the USA, Rock Im Tal in Switzerland and the O2 in London at the Stone Free Festival. This was followed in June by a Weekend With Tyketto (We've Got tomorrow, We've Got Tonight) in Pontypridd, Wales for a special DVD recording which was released as a live CD/DVD.
After the Strength In Numbers 25th Anniversary Tour in March 2019, Tyketto headed to Festivals in Switzerland in August and Germany in September before holding 2 Live Album Launch Parties. This was for the release of Strength In Numbers Live and was held on 25 October at The Queens Hall in Nuneaton and the 26th October at The Corporation in Sheffield. The official album release date was 8 November 2019.

On 18 June 2022, Danny Vaughn announced on Youtube, that co-founder Michael Clayton and guitarist Chris Green will leave the band for family reasons in 2023. Their last concert will be at the Melodic Rock Cruise in 2023.

In December 2022 a 12-date co-headline tour in the United Kingdom with Dare and FM was announced.

Members

Current
Danny Vaughn – lead vocals, acoustic guitars, harmonica, percussion (1987–1995, 2004, 2007, 2008–present)
Michael Clayton (Arbeeny) – drums, percussion, backing vocals (1987–1996, 2004, 2007, 2008–2023)
Chris Green – lead guitar, backing vocals (2014–2023)
Greg Smith – bass guitar, backing vocals (2017–present)
Ged Rylands – keyboards, backing vocals (2012–present)

Past
Steve Augeri – lead vocals (1995–1996)
P.J. Zitarosa – lead guitar, backing vocals (2008–2011)
Jaimie Scott – bass guitar, backing vocals (1991–1996)
Brooke St. James (David Rundall) – lead guitars, keyboards, percussion, backing vocals (1987–1996, 2004, 2007, 2011–2014)
Bobby Lynch – keyboards, backing vocals (2011–2012)
Jimi Kennedy – bass guitar, percussion, backing vocals (1987–1991, 2004, 2007, 2008–2014)
Chris Childs – bass guitar, backing vocals (2014–2017)

Timeline

Discography

Studio albums
Don't Come Easy (1991)
Strength in Numbers (1994)
Shine (1995)
Dig in Deep (2012)
Reach (2016)

Live albums
Take Out & Served Up Live (1996)
Live From Milan (2017)
We've Got Tomorrow, We've Got Tonight (2018)
Strength In Numbers Live (2019)

Compilation albums
The Last Sunset - Farewell 2007 (2007)

References

External links
 Official site
 Dig In Deep on Amazon.com

Hard rock musical groups from New York (state)
Musical groups established in 1987
Musical groups from New York City
Geffen Records artists